The name Elmar is used by Leica to designate camera lenses of four elements that have a maximum aperture of f/3.98 or f/4.0.

History
The Elmar lenses originally had a maximum aperture of f/3.5. These lenses were derived from a 50 mm f/3.5 Elmax lens first produced in 1925. The name is a combination of Ernst Leitz and Max Berek.

Description
Elmar lenses variously has a maximum f-number of  f/2.8 or f/3.4 or f/3.8 or f/4. Currently the Elmar lenses have a maximum aperture of f/3.8 or f/4, as in the Elmar-M 24 mm f/3.8 and Tri-Elmar-M 16-18-21 mm f/4. The name Elmar is sometimes combined with: Super, Tele, APO, Macro or Vario.

Market positions
Elmar lenses are comparatively slow. As a result they tend to be smaller and lighter than faster lenses of the same focal length.

List of Elmar lenses

For the M39 lens mount
 Elmar 35 mm  
 Elmar 50 mm  collapsible
 Elmar 90mm 
For the Leica M mount
 Tri-Elmar-M 16-18-21 mm  ASPH.
 Tri-Elmar-M 28–35–50 mm  ASPH.
 Super-Elmar-M 18 mm  ASPH.
 Super-Elmar-M 21 mm  ASPH.
 Elmar-M 50 mm 
 Elmar-M 50 mm 
 Macro-Elmar-M 90 mm 
 Elmar 135 mm 

For the Leica R mount
 Leica 15 mm  Super-Elmar-R – 1980 (Carl Zeiss design)
 Leica 100 mm  Macro-Elmar-R bellows version
 Leica 100 mm  Macro-Elmar-R helical version
 Leica 180 mm  Elmar-R – 1976
 Leica 21 mm–35 mm – Vario-Elmar-R zoom – 2002
 Leica 28 mm–70 mm –4.5 Vario-Elmar-R zoom
 Leica 35–70  Vario-Elmar-R zoom
 Leica 35–70 mm  Vario-Elmar-R zoom (Minolta design and glass production)
 Leica 70–210 mm  Vario-Elmar-R zoom (Minolta design and glass production)
 Leica 75–200 mm  Vario-Elmar-R – 1976–1984 (Minolta design and glass production)
 Leica 80–200 mm  Vario-Elmar-R zoom
 Leica 80–200 mm  Vario-Elmar-R zoom
 Leica 105–280 mm  Vario-Elmar-R zoom

For the Leica S mount
 Super-Elmar-S 1:3.5/24 mm ASPH.
 TS-APO-Elmar-S 1:5.6/120 mm ASPH. (Schneider-Kreuznach design)
 Apo-Elmar-S 1:3.5/180 mm ASPH.
 Apo-Elmar-S 1:3.5/180 mm ASPH. CS
 Vario-Elmar-S 1:3.5-5.6/30–90 mm ASPH.

For the Leica L Mount
 Super-Vario-Elmar-SL 1:3.5–4.5 / 16–35 ASPH.

See also
 Tessar

References

External links

Leica lenses
Photographic lenses